William Macquarie Cowper (known in his youth as Macquarie; 3 July 1810 – 14 June 1902) was an Australian Anglican archdeacon and Dean of Sydney.

Cowper was born in Sydney, the son of the Revd William Cowper, assistant colonial chaplain, and his second wife, Ann (née Barrell) . Educated by his father and at the University of Oxford, he graduated BA from Magdalen Hall in 1833 and MA in 1835. Following admission to deacon´s order, he was appointed curate of St Petrox, Dartmouth, and ordained priest at Exeter in 1834. He returned to Australia in 1836 and was made chaplain at Port Stephens, New South Wales where he remained for 20 years. He then became Acting Principal of Moore Theological College, Sydney, for a few months after the college opened at Liverpool on 1 March 1856, following which he became incumbent of St. John´s, Bishopthorpe.

In 1858 Cowper succeeded his father at St Philip's Church, Sydney. Later the same year he was appointed Archdeacon and Dean of Sydney. In 1869 he left St Philip¨s for the cathedral parish, which he occupied until his death. He several times acted as commissary for bishops Frederic Barker and Alfred Barry during their absences in England. In 1896 he was chosen Fellow of the Australian College of Theology. He was admired for his piety and kindliness.

He published Episcopate of the Right Reverend Frederic Barker, D.D. in 1888 and his autobiography, The Autobiography and Reminiscences of William Macquarie Cowper, was published soon after his death.

Cowper died, aged 91, at the Deanery in Sydney on 14 June 1902, and was buried at St Jude's cemetery, Randwick.

He was married twice and was survived by his children.

References 

 K. J. Cable, Cowper, William Macquarie (1810 - 1902), Australian Dictionary of Biography, Volume 3, MUP, 1969, pp. 480–482.
 
 Peter G. Bolt, William Cowper (1778-1858). The Indispensable Parson. The Life and Influence of Australia's First Parish Clergyman (Camperdown, NSW: Bolt Publishing Services, 2009).

External links
Parish Church of St Philip, Sydney

1810 births
1902 deaths
Deans of Sydney
Anglican archdeacons in Australia
Academic staff of Moore Theological College
Alumni of Magdalen Hall, Oxford